Ramiz Kerimov  (born 4 August 1981) is an Azerbaijani former football  goalkeeper.

Career statistics

References

External links
Player profile

1981 births
Living people
Azerbaijani footballers
Khazar Lankaran FK players
Association football goalkeepers
MOIK Baku players